Mesopontonia is a genus of shrimp belonging to the palaemoniid subfamily Pontoniinae. It was first described in 1967 by Alexander James Bruce.

Species
 Mesopontonia brevicarpus Li & Bruce, 2006
 Mesopontonia brucei Burukovsky, 1991
 Mesopontonia gorgoniophila Bruce, 1967
 Mesopontonia gracilicarpus Bruce, 1990
 Mesopontonia monodactylus Bruce, 1991
 Mesopontonia verrucimanus Bruce, 1996

References

Palaemonoidea
Crustaceans described in 1967
Taxa named by Alexander James Bruce
Decapod genera